Harsidhhi, one of the aspects of Durga is a regional Hindu goddess, popular in Gujarat, Madhya Pradesh, adjoining Maharashtra states of India.

Names
Harsiddhi, a contracted form or, at its very least, a form of "Harshad Amba" – The Happy Mother, is considered one of the aspects of Amba and Kalika, the Hindu Devi.  She is also known by the names like  Harshal,  Harshad,  Harshat, Harsidh Bhvani.

Kuldevi
She is worshiped as Kuldevi by many Kshatriya, Brahmin, Rajput and Vaishya communities. The Chandarana clan of Lohanas, Brahmakshatriyas, Harsana clan of Gurjars, many Jain castes as well Brahmins like Panchariya and many other communities also worship her as their Kuldevi. She is also religiously worshiped by fishermen and other sea-faring tribes and people of Gujarat as she is considered protector of ships at sea. She is worshipped by Kamboya Turi-Barot people of North Gujarat as their Kuldevi.

Temples

Ancient Temple at Top of Koyla Dungar, Miyani

Harshidhhi Mata Temple also known as Harshal Mata Temple located at Miyani village, some 30 km away from Porbandar en route to Dwarka. The main temple was originally located on a hilltop facing the sea. It is said Krishna had worshiped her during his lifetime and has since been living atop hill called Koyla Dungar. The original temple atop the hill is said to have been built by Krishna himself. Krishna wanted to defeat the asuras and Jarasandha so he prayed to Amba Mata for power. With the blessings of the goddess, Krishna was able to defeat the Asuras. After this success, he built the temple. When Jarasandha was killed, all Yadavas over overjoyed (harshit) and they celebrated their success here. Hence the name Harshad Mata or Harsiddhi Mata. She has since been worshiped as kuldevi of Yadav.

Present Temple at Foot Hill of Koyla Dungar, Miyani built by Jagdu Shah 

Jagadu, the 13th century merchant from Kutch, is accredited for building a temple of goddess the present temple at the foot-hill of Koyal Dungar near old port town of Miyani near Porbandar. His statue is also placed on the right side of the goddess in the temple. The legend associated with temple goes like this: The original temple of goddess was on the hill overlooking the creek, which is still there but now idols are at foot hill. The sea-shore of Miyani was inaccessible, as any ship which would come within eye-sight of Goddesses, would sink. Jagdu Shah was travelling with his fleet of 7 ships. He was on the last ship with his family. One by one his 6 ships sank in front of his eyes. He was amazed and terrified to see this. His Captain told him that we warned you that no ships can reach within sight of temple over the hill now only Goddesss Harsidhhi can save us. Jagdu prayed to Devi for safe anchoring in shore and his ship reached safely the shore. Jagadu went to the temple and observed fast for three days to please the goddess. She appeared and Jagadu persuaded her to descend the hill so her eyes do not fall on ships. She agreed to acceded to his request if he would sacrifice a buffalo each step leading down the hill. Jagadu was perplexed as being follower of Jainism, he believed in non-violence. To keep his words, Jagadu brought buffaloes and sacrificed but the number fell short and the goddess was still few steps away from the new temple site. So he decided to sacrifice himself and his family. The goddess pleased for his devotion his family was brought back to life. She also granted boon that his family would get moksha.

Temple at Ujjain, Madhya Pradesh

Another famous temple is located at Ujjain, which is said to have been built by famous King Vikramāditya. Vikramaditya is said to have visited Koyla Dungar at Miyani, then known as Minalpur, a port city ruled by Prabhatsen Chavda of Chawda dynasty.  Vikramadiya was blessed by the Devi. He requested Harsidhhi Mata, to come to his kingdom at Ujjain, where he would worship her daily. She is also known as Vahanvati Mata.

Temple at Rajpipla, Gujarat
One more famous temple is located in Rajpipla, where she is worshiped as Kuldevi by former princely State of Rajpipla, where she had come from Ujjain.

Temple at Ladol, Gujarat
Another temple is located at Ladol, which was built by Jayasimha Siddharaja in 11th century.

Other noted temples

Other temples are located at Palaj, Ruppur near Chanasma, Patan, Porbandar, Indore, Jabalpur, Dwarka, Wadhwan, Aurangabad, Badod, Varvala, Lunavada, Chand Baori, Haripura, Kutch. Another Temple is located in Rajasthan at Lampolai which is Centre point of Rajasthan and it is near by Ajmer approx 60 km by road.

Photo gallery

References

Hindu goddesses
Mother goddesses
Forms of Parvati
Hindu folk deities